Banpas railway station is a railway station of Sahibganj loop line under Howrah railway division of Eastern Railway zone. It is situated at Belari, Banpas in Purba Bardhaman district in the Indian state of West Bengal.

References

Railway stations in Purba Bardhaman district
Howrah railway division
Railway stations opened in 1860
1860 establishments in India